Levan Jordania (born 1 January 1997) is a Georgian professional footballer who plays as a midfielder for Gagra.

Career
Having spent time in the academies of Vitesse and Achilles '29, Jordania made his professional debut in September 2018 for Eindhoven, coming on as substitute in a 3-0 victory over Jong Ajax. In February 2021, he joined the reserve side of Austria Wien.

Personal life
Jordania is the son of retired footballer and former Vitesse owner Merab Jordania.

References

External links

Living people
1997 births
Footballers from Tbilisi
Footballers from Georgia (country)
Association football midfielders
Achilles '29 players
FC Eindhoven players
FC Den Bosch players
FC Locomotive Tbilisi players
Derde Divisie players
Eerste Divisie players
2. Liga (Austria) players
Expatriate footballers from Georgia (country)
Expatriate sportspeople from Georgia (country) in the Netherlands
Expatriate footballers in the Netherlands
Expatriate sportspeople from Georgia (country) in Austria
Expatriate footballers in Austria
FC Sioni Bolnisi players
Erovnuli Liga players
FC Gagra players